Jörn Leonhard (born 27 May 1967 in Birkenfeld) is Professor of West European History at the History Department of the University of Freiburg. From 2007 to 2012, he was co-director of the School of History at the Freiburg Institute for Advanced Studies (FRIAS). Hitherto his works have concentrated on the history of liberalism, nationalism, empire, and war.

Selected bibliography

Monographs
 2001. Liberalismus - Zur historischen Semantik eines europäischen Deutungsmusters, Oldenbourg.
 2008. Bellizismus und Nation. Kriegsdeutung und Nationsbestimmung in Europa und den Vereinigten Staaten 1750-1914, Oldenbourg.
 2010. Empires und Nationalstaaten im 19. Jahrhundert, co-authored with Ulrike von Hirschhausen, Vandenhoeck & Ruprecht.
 2014. Die Büchse der Pandora: Geschichte des Ersten Weltkriegs, C.H. Beck, translated to English (Patrick Camiller), 2018. Pandora's Box, A History of the First World War, Belknap/Harvard.
 2018. Der überforderte Frieden. Versailles und die Welt, 1918-1923, C.H. Beck.

Edited Volumes
 2001. (co-ed). Nationalismen in Europa: West- und Osteuropa im Vergleich, Wallstein.
 2002. (co-ed). Ten years of German Unification. Transfer, Transformation, Incorporation, Birmingham UP.
 2010. (co-ed). Comparing Empires: Encounters and Transfers in the Long Nineteenth Century, Vandenhoek & Ruprecht, 
 2011. (co-ed). What Makes the Nobility Noble? Comparative Perspectives from the Sixteenth to the Twentieth Century, Vandenhoeck & Ruprecht.
 2015. (ed.). Vergleich und Verflechtung. Deutschland und Frankreich im 20. Jahrhundert, Erich Schmidt Verlag.
 2015. (co-ed). Liberalismus im 20. Jahrhundert, Steiner Verlag.
 2016. (co-ed). Semantiken von Arbeit in diachroner und vergleichender Perspektive, Böhlau.
 2017. (co-ed). Sakralität und Heldentum, Ergon Verlag.

Articles
 2007. (with Ulrike von Hirschhausen)
 2009. Rule and Conflict, Representation and Crisis: Multi-Ethnic Empires since the Nineteenth Century, Leiden, i:V. (with Ulrike von Hirschhausen).
 2009. The Sediments of History. Language and the Time in the International Perception of Reinhard Koselleck, Brill Studies in the History of Political Thought, i:V, Leiden.

References

1967 births
Living people
21st-century German historians
German male non-fiction writers